Elbrus Savkuyevich Zurayev (born 12 May 1982) is a Russian former football player.

Club career
He made his Russian Premier League debut for FC Alania Vladikavkaz on 6 April 2003 in a game against FC Rotor Volgograd.

External links
 
 

1982 births
Sportspeople from Vladikavkaz
Living people
Russian footballers
Association football defenders
Russian Premier League players
FC Spartak Vladikavkaz players
FC KAMAZ Naberezhnye Chelny players
FC Kuban Krasnodar players
FC Torpedo Moscow players
FC SKA-Khabarovsk players
FC Volgar Astrakhan players
Russian First League players
Russian Second League players